The 1986 Massachusetts gubernatorial election was held on November 4, 1986. Michael Dukakis was elected Governor of Massachusetts for a third term. He defeated Republican George Kariotis by a 69–31% margin. This would be the last time a Democrat was elected governor until 2006. This remains the last time that the Democrats won more than two consecutive gubernatorial elections in the state.

The race between Dukakis and Kariotis is the only time that the two major parties backed Greek immigrants for governor.

Democratic primary

Governor

Candidates
Michael Dukakis, incumbent governor

Michael Dukakis was unopposed for the Democratic nomination.

Lieutenant Governor

Candidates
Gerard D'Amico, State Senator from Worcester
Evelyn Murphy, former Secretary of Environmental Affairs and candidate for Lt. Governor in 1982

John Kerry, the Democratic nominee for lieutenant governor in 1982, did not run for reelection as he had been elected to the United States Senate in 1984.

Results

Republican primary

Governor

Candidates
George Kariotis, businessman and former Secretary of Economic Affairs

Withdrew
Greg Hyatt, lawyer and candidate for Massachusetts's 5th congressional district in 1984
Royall H. Switzler, State Representative from Wellesley

Eliminated at convention
Guy Carbone, former Metropolitan District Commissioner

Declined
Paul W. Cronin, former U.S. Representative for Massachusetts's 5th congressional district
Edward J. King, former Democratic governor

Campaign
On March 13, Greg Hyatt became the first Republican to enter the gubernatorial race. A self-described "populist conservative", Hyatt supported limiting state taxes, bringing back the death penalty, and competency testing and merit pay for teachers. He opposed the state law that made wearing a seat belt mandatory, the use of roadblocks to crack down on drunken driving, and the use of public funds for abortions.

Shortly before the Republican convention, Boston attorney and former Metropolitan District Commissioner Guy Carbone entered the race.

The convention nomination was won by Royall H. Switzler, a state representative who had been drafted by anti-Hyatt Republicans after former Congressman Paul W. Cronin decided not to enter the race. To receive the endorsement of the party, a candidate must receive the support of 50% of the delegates. Only candidates receiving 15% of the vote or more on any ballot would be eligible for a primary. After a strong showing on the first ballot, some of Hyatt's major supporters, including Ray Shamie and Papa Gino's founder Michael Valerio, announced that they would not oppose Switzler's endorsement. On the second ballot, Switzler won the nomination with 975 votes. Since Carbone did not exceed 15% of the vote on either ballot, he was eliminated.

{| class="wikitable sortable plainrowheaders"
! colspan="5"  | State Republican Convention results, 1986
|- style="background:#eee; text-align:center;"
! scope="col" style="width: 12em" |Candidate
! scope="col"  style="width: 5em" |First ballot
! scope="col"  style="width: 5em" |Pct.
! scope="col"  style="width: 5em" |Second ballot
! scope="col"  style="width: 5em" |Pct.
|-
!scope="row| 
| style="text-align:center;"| 775
| style="text-align:center;"| 40.28%
| style="text-align:center;"| 975
| style="text-align:center;"| 51.02%
|-
! scope="row" | | style="text-align:center;"| 891 
| style="text-align:center;"| 46.31%| style="text-align:center;"| 876| style="text-align:center;"| 45.84%|-
!scope="row| | style="text-align:center;"| 258| style="text-align:center;"| 13.41%| style="text-align:center;"| 60| style="text-align:center;"| 3.14%'''
|-

Despite losing the nomination, Hyatt chose to stay in the race and run against Switzler in the Republican primary. However, Switzler dropped out of the race in June after inaccuracies about his military record were revealed. He had falsely claimed to be a member of the United States Army Special Forces and stated that he had fought in Vietnam when he had only visited Vietnam on leave from noncombat duty in Korea.

Hyatt then dropped out of the race on July 14 amid accusations of forging names on his nomination papers, having ties to organized crime, and erratic personal behavior which included working nude in his office.

Businessman and former Secretary of Economic Affairs George Kariotis entered the race after both candidates dropped out. Because the filing deadline for the election was on March 1, Hyatt and Switzler remained on the ballot while Kariotis was forced to run a write in campaign. Hyatt won the election, but he and Switzler, who finished second, declined the nomination and Kariotis was declared the nominee.

Results

Due to the fact that both listed candidates had dropped out of the race, the Republican primary saw extremely low turnout.

Lieutenant Governor

Candidates
 Nicholas M. Nikitas, hotel operator, real estate developer, and Republican Party activist

General election

Results
Dukakis won a convincing victory over Kariotis. He increased his margins across the state, winning all 14 counties with a majority, even as total vote numbers were down sharply from the previous election.

Soon after being sworn in for his third term as governor, Dukakis began to run for the Democratic nomination for president in 1988.

Results by county

See also
 1985–1986 Massachusetts legislature

References

1986
Massachusetts
Gubernatorial
Michael Dukakis